The Ienăchiță Văcărescu National College is a high school located in the city of Târgoviște, Dâmbovița County, Romania. It was established at the end of the 19th century and is the oldest high school in the city.

External links
 Website

Buildings and structures in Târgoviște
Education in Târgoviște
Vacarescu
National Colleges in Romania
Historic monuments in Dâmbovița County